Aliki Stergiadu (born 5 October 1972) is a former competitive ice dancer. She is the 1991 World Junior champion with Juris Razgulajevs for the Soviet Union.

Personal life 
Stergiadu was born on 5 October 1972 in Tashkent, Uzbek SSR, Soviet Union. She lived in Elektrostal, Russia until she took a coaching position in Skellefteå, Sweden in 2006. She married Lennart "Lelle" Erinder in September 2012 in Skellefteå.

Career 
Stergiadu began skating at age five. Early in her career, she competed for the Soviet Union with Juris Razgulajevs. Coached by Natalia Linichuk in Moscow, they won the 1991 World Junior Championships in Budapest, Hungary.

Stergiadu/Razgulajevs moved up to the senior level in the 1991–92 season. The Soviet Union having dissolved, they decided to compete for Latvia. They placed tenth at the 1992 World Championships in Oakland, California.

In the 1992–93 season, Stergiadu/Razgulajevs began representing Uzbekistan. They won a silver medal at the 1992 Piruetten in Hamar and finished tenth at the 1993 World Championships in Prague.

They were awarded bronze at the 1993 NHK Trophy in Chiba, Japan. In February 1994, Stergiadu/Razgulajevs competed at the Winter Olympics in Lillehammer and finished 13th. Their last competition together was the 1994 World Championships in Chiba, where they placed 11th.

Stergiadu is an international technical specialist in ice dancing for Sweden.

Results 
(with Razgulajevs for the Soviet Union, Latvia and Uzbekistan)

References 

1972 births
Living people
Pontic Greeks
Soviet female ice dancers
Latvian female ice dancers
Uzbekistani female ice dancers
Olympic figure skaters of Uzbekistan
Figure skaters at the 1994 Winter Olympics
World Junior Figure Skating Championships medalists
Sportspeople from Tashkent
Uzbekistani people of Greek descent
Soviet people of Greek descent